The Rolleicord is a medium-format twin lens reflex camera made by Franke & Heidecke (Rollei) between 1933 and 1976. It was a simpler, less expensive version of the high-end Rolleiflex TLR, aimed at amateur photographers who wanted a high-quality camera but could not afford the expensive Rolleiflex. Several models of Rolleicord were made; the later models generally had more advanced features and tend to be valued higher in today's market.

The first Rolleicord, introduced in November 1933, was the Rolleicord I. This camera was a simplified version of the Standard Rolleiflex, with a cheaper 75mm Zeiss Triotar lens and a simplified film advance mechanism using a knob instead of the crank found on the Rolleiflex. The Rolleicord I was available either with a plain leatherette covering or elaborately patterned metal faceplates. The latter variant is referred to as the "Art Deco" Rolleicord.

The models that have the letters DRP on the left and to the right DRGM on the front of the camera means that they were made before  World War II, because DRP means 'Deutsches Reichspatent' (German Reich patent) and DRGM means 'Deutsches Reichs-Gebrauchsmuster' (roughly equivalent to a design copyright). In post WW2 models you will find DBP and DBGM. They switched from "Reichs" to "Bundes" (German Federal Patent). 

Later models incorporated improved designs for the taking lens, a 4-element Schneider Kreuznach Xenar, which also appeared on the Rolleiflex cameras. However, while the Rolleiflex was also available with an f/2.8 lens, the Rolleicord was never offered with a larger aperture than f/3.5, thus ensuring its pedigree as an "amateur" camera.

An accessory, known as a Rolleikin kit, was available for the Rolleicord (and the Rolleiflex) to enable it to accept 35mm film.

List of models

Rolleicord I (Art Deco) (1933-1936)
Rolleicord I (leatherette) (1934-1936)
Rolleicord Ia (1936-1947)
Rolleicord II (1936-1937)
Rolleicord II, type 2 (1937-1938)
Rolleicord II, type 3 (1938-1939)
Rolleicord II, type 4 (1939-1949)
Rolleicord II, type 5 (1947-1950)
Rolleicord II, type 6 (1949-1950)
Rolleicord III (1950-1953)
Rolleicord IV (1953-1954)
Rolleicord V (1954-1957)
Rolleicord Va (1957-1961)
Rolleicord Vb (1962-1976)

Estimated market desirability 
A Vb model with a serial number beginning with 2 or 3 is slightly more valuable in most cases depending on condition first and foremost.

References

External links
International Rolleiclub website with details on all Rollei models
Rolleicord Model Guide
Rolleiflex/Rolleicord Repair Shops and Related Services World Wide by Ferdi Stutterheim

German cameras
Rollei TLR cameras
Rollei brands
120 film cameras